Pagguy Zunda (born 23 May 1983) is a retired Swedish footballer. Zunda was part of the Djurgården Swedish champions' team of 2002.

Honours

Club 
 Djurgårdens IF 
 Allsvenskan: 2002

References

Swedish footballers
Djurgårdens IF Fotboll players
1983 births
Living people
Association football forwards